is a Japanese manga series written and illustrated by Rensuke Oshikiri that ran from October 2010 to September 2018. The story revolves around the life of gamer Haruo Yaguchi, the co-op gaming setting, (most notably fighting games) his relationship with quiet gamer Akira Ono, and the changes that develop with both over time. Known as a 1990s arcade romantic comedy, the series is notable for its unique art style, and accurate depictions of the multitude of gaming software, hardware, and cultures that are featured. An anime television series adaptation by J.C.Staff and SMDE aired from July to September 2018. A second season aired from October to December 2019.

Characters

/
 (Japanese); Johnny Yong Bosch (English)
A young man with an affinity for gaming, nicknamed "Beastly Fingers Haruo". He met his match during a fateful encounter with Akira Ono while playing Street Fighter II. Undeterred after losing, he still sees her as an opponent he must challenge and eventually beat. While he starts as a snarky brat with an ego, he eventually grows out of it. However, he never abandons his dedication and love for gaming, which almost borders on unhealthy obsession. On the bright side, this pure passion for gaming is what leads him to find some of his closest friends.

 (Japanese); Christine Marie Cabanos (English)
The daughter of the Ono Zaibatsu, Akira is rich, popular, and multi-talented – the polar opposite of Haruo. To escape the strict educational regimen she faces at home, she sneaks away every so often to play in arcades where she showcases her exceptional gaming ability. She initially encounters Haruo during a match of Street Fighter II, and from then on, she bonds with him over their love for gaming. She never talks and communicates solely through gestures and facial expressions. She also appears as a guest support character in Million Arthur: Arcana Blood.

 (Japanese); Erika Harlacher (English)
A girl who was introduced as a junior high classmate of Haruo's before attending an all-girls high school with Onizuka, initially introverted and spent much of her time studying alone before spending time with Haruo after her family store acquired a Neo Geo MVS. She became a more sociable person with an interest in gaming after spending time, her natural instinct for fighting games making her a force to be reckoned with. After a fateful showdown at her and Haruo was usual stomping grounds and her jealous nature, she developed a bit of a sadistic side whenever Haruo's around. Eventually, Nikotama, head of the "Mizonokuchi Force," took notice of Koharu and her skills and did everything he could to reawaken Koharu's passion for fighting games. In Hi Score Girl DASH, a spinoff series, she takes a job teaching middle school.

Hidaka Shop's operators.

 (Japanese); Lucien Dodge (English)
One of Haruo's classmates during junior high and high school who is his best friend. He also enjoys arcades, though not to the same degree as Haruo. He has a knack for attracting the ladies, and is quick to pick up on the bizarre love triangle formed by his classmates.

Haruo's middle school years 2-3 teacher.

 (Japanese); Kyle McCarley (English)
Haruo's classmate in 6-2 and again in high school. A snobby kid who tries to come off as cultured and suave, his attempts to woo Akira are met with failure. During high school, he begins to hang around Haruo and Miyao.

 (Japanese); Cherami Leigh (English)
The bespectacled official instructor of the Ono household. A totalitarian authoritarian who will stop at nothing to make sure Akira is nothing short of perfect and worthy as an heir to the Ono family name, she is absolutely against any kind of fun within the Ono household, which creates friction amongst its inhabitants. After seeing the effect Haruo's had on Akira and the error of her ways, she begins to relent a little, with emphasis on the word "little". If one doesn't work hard enough, she piles on more work. If one works too hard, she rewards them by piling on more work.

 (Japanese); Cristina Vee (English)
A girl who went to school with Haruo from elementary to junior high, then seen at the same all-girl high school with Koharu. She is grotesque in appearance and crass in demeanor, though she apparently isn't self aware of that. She also has a noticeable lisp.

 (Japanese); Cindy Robinson (English)
The energetic mother of Haruo. (The disposition of Yagouchi's father is unknown and deliberately never mentioned in the show or anime; he may be deceased, divorced or perhaps simply absent due to work.) Despite his shortcomings, she's very supportive of her son in her own quirky and loving manner. Whenever there's company, she's quick to offer her special stack of "Hotcakes Straight From a Manga".

 (Japanese); Joe Ochman (English)
An elderly man that works as Akira's chauffeur. He is a self-proclaimed pachinko addict, and has a nasty habit of running over Haruo with the family limousine.

 
 (Japanese); Cristina Vee (English)
Akira's defiant older sister gave up her claim to the Ono empire to her younger sibling. She secretly regretted doing so, having seen the wringer Moemi put her sister through over several years. She has since lightened up knowing that Akira's found a friend in Haruo through her formerly secret passion for gaming. Makoto has extremely similar features to her younger sister Akira, but none of the discipline and fortitude. Having grown tired of the Spartan upbringing brought upon her by her family name, she now tries to enjoy the wonders of the "outside world" much to the ire of the family tutor, Moemi. As such, she frequently runs into Haruo and his friends after her introduction. She's also on good terms with Haruo's mother and has become yet another frequent guest of the Yaguchi household.

 (Japanese); Joe Ochman (English)
A guidance counselor at Haruo's middle school, and likes to play video games as well. He resembles Lau Chan from Virtua Fighter series.

Daughter of an arcade proprietor, Felicia is the head of the "Mizonokuchi Force", a band of gamers who operate in Kawasaki City. She takes Koharu under her wing after witnessing her skill.

Aulbath Ōimachi

Sagat Takdanobaba

Blanka Kuhombutsu 

Sasquatch Tamagawagakuenmae

Video game characters
Various video game characters were credited for redubbing for the television series, except for Phobos/Huitzil, Driver, Hell Chaos, EDI.E, Holmes, Watson, and Geese.

Street Fighter

A USA fighter introduced in Street Fighter II: The World Warrior. The voices of 'Sonic Boom' and 'Faneffu' were dubbed for the television series.

A Soviet Union fighter introduced in Street Fighter II: The World Warrior, and Akira's favourite character.
/Akuma
A hidden character from Japan, introduced in Super Street Fighter II Turbo.

A Japanese fighter introduced in Street Fighter II: The World Warrior.

An Indian fighter introduced in Street Fighter II: The World Warrior.

A Brazilian fighter introduced in Street Fighter II: The World Warrior.

A Chinese fighter introduced in Street Fighter II: The World Warrior.
/M.Bison
A fighter from the Thailand stage, introduced in Street Fighter II: The World Warrior.
/Charlie
A USA fighter introduced in Street Fighter Alpha: Warriors' Dreams.

Final Fight

A Final Fight Round 1 boss.

A Final Fight Round 3 boss.

A Final Fight playable character.

Darkstalkers
/Huitzil
A Darkstalkers fighter, and Koharu's favourite character.

A Darkstalkers fighter.

Ghosts 'n Goblins

The player character from Ghosts 'n Goblins.

Out Run

The driver from Out Run.

Puzzle & Action: Tant-R

A detective from Puzzle & Action: Tant-R, resembles Sherlock Holmes.

A detective from Puzzle & Action: Tant-R, resembles Dr. Watson.

Genpei Tōma Den

A Genpei Tōma Den character.

A Genpei Tōma Den stage 46 (Kamakura) boss.

Puzzle Bobble
/Bub
The green dinosaur player character in Puzzle Bobble.

Fatal Fury

A Fatal Fury fighter.

Splatterhouse

The Splatterhouse stage 7 final boss.

Hammerin' Harry
/Harry
The player character from Hammerin' Harry.

Gaming machines

Haruo's video game devices.

Media

Manga
Oshikiri launched the manga in Square Enix's Monthly Big Gangan on October 25, 2010, and ended its serialization on September 25, 2018 in the tenth 2018 issue of the magazine. The series has been published in ten tankōbon volumes, with the first volume released on February 25, 2012, and the tenth and final volume released on March 25, 2019. 

Square Enix Manga & Books licensed the manga in English, with the first volume released on February 25, 2020, and the last on January 17, 2023.

The December 2019 issue of Monthly Big Gangan announced that a spinoff manga titled Hi Score Girl DASH focusing on Koharu Hidaka, now a middle school teacher, would be in the magazine's next issue on December 25.

Anime
Monthly Big Gangan announced in December 2013 that an anime adaptation was green-lit. In March 2018, the anime adaptation was confirmed to be a television series animated by SMDE, with production by J.C. Staff. It aired from July 13 to September 28, 2018. It is directed by Yoshiki Yamakawa and written by Tatsuhiko Urahata, featuring character designs by Michiru Kuwabata, and music by Yoko Shimomura. The series' opening theme song "New Stranger" was performed by Sora tob sakana, while the series' ending theme song "Hōkago Distraction" was performed by Etsuko Yakushimaru. Netflix streamed the anime on December 24, 2018, with an English dub. The series received 3 OVA episodes titled Extra Stage that premiered on March 20, 2019.

A second, nine episode long season aired from October 25 to December 20, 2019, with the staff and cast reprising their roles. The second season's opening theme song "Flash" was performed by Sora tob sakana, while the second season's ending theme song "Unknown World Map" was performed by Etsuko Yakushimaru. Season 2 premiered on Netflix on April 9, 2020 outside of Japan and China.

Reception
It was number two on the 2013 Takarajimasha's Kono Manga ga Sugoi! Top 20 Manga for Male Readers survey. It was also nominated for the 6th Manga Taishō and the 17th Tezuka Osamu Cultural Prize. It was number nine in the 2013 Comic Natalie Grand Prize.

As of December 30, 2012, volume 3 has sold 59,016 copies and as of July 7, 2013, volume 4 has sold 103,734 copies.

Legal issues
On August 5, 2014, Osaka District Police searched the offices of Square Enix, the publishers of Hi Score Girl, acting on an IP violation claim by SNK Playmore stating that the manga allegedly features over 100 instances of characters from The King of Fighters, Samurai Shodown, and other fighting games. In response, Square Enix voluntarily recalled all printed volumes and temporarily suspended publication of future volumes and digital sales. However, the manga continued its run in Monthly Big Gangan.

In August 2015, it was reported that Square Enix and SNK Playmore had reached a settlement, cancelling the lawsuit and enabling the manga to be sold again in different formats.

See also
Pupipō!, another manga series by Rensuke Oshikiri
Semai Sekai no Identity, another manga series by Rensuke Oshikiri

References

External links
Hi Score Girl on Netflix
High Score Girl at Square Enix Big Gangan 
Square Enix Manga and Books page: Hi Score Girl
J.C.STAFF page: HSG, HSG2
Hi Score Girl Anime Official Site 

Comics set in the 1990s
Gangan Comics manga
J.C.Staff
Netflix original anime
Romantic comedy anime and manga
Seinen manga
Shogakukan franchises
Square Enix franchises
Tokyo MX original programming
Works about video games